Johannes Quack (born 1959) is a German ethnologist at the Goethe University Frankfurt whose primary field of study is religion. He is also the head of the Emmy Noether Research Group “Diversity of Non-Religiosity” at the Goethe University Frankfurt.

He has researched non-religious and rationalist organisations in India. He received the Max Weber Award from the Max Weber Center for Advanced Cultural and Social Studies at the University of Erfurt for his work Disenchanting India: Organized Rationalism and Criticism on Religion in India.

Life and work
Quack was born in 1959 in Anrath. He studied religious studies, anthropology and philosophy at the University of Bayreuth. Later, he taught anthropology and religious studies at the University of Heidelberg, Lucerne, Münster, Tübingen and Munich. He used to work at the Cluster of Excellence: Asia and Europe in a Global Context, Heidelberg University as a post-doctoral researcher and McGill University in Montreal as a research fellow.

His field of research includes religion, Hindu traditions, ritual theory, criticism of religion, and mental illness. He has done field work in India about religious tourism, non-religious group and psychosocial problems.

Published works
Books
 
 

Peer-reviewed papers
 
 
 
 

Articles

References

External links
 Official website
 Faculty page at the Goethe University Frankfurt

Living people
1959 births
Academic staff of Goethe University Frankfurt
German anthropologists
Social anthropologists
Cultural anthropologists
Robert Schumann Hochschule alumni